The Collection is the third compilation album by boy band NSYNC. The album was released on January 25, 2010, nearly five years after the release of the band's Greatest Hits. Unlike their Greatest Hits, the album only contains the singles released in the UK, as well as other popular tracks from their three studio albums.

Track listing

2010 greatest hits albums
NSYNC albums